Journey to Karabakh is a 1992  novel by Georgian writer Aka Morchiladze. The setting is the First Nagorno-Karabakh War (1988 – 1994). The novel depicts the misadventures of a Georgian youth who is accidentally involved in the conflict.

In 2005 film director Levan Tutberidze made a film based on this novel.

About novel
Morchiladze's first and best-known novel has been a best-seller ever since it first appeared. This is an indication of the narrative's continuing relevance, especially in its treatment of the emotional condition of an entire generation and the absurdity of the conflicts in the Caucasus. A book about the tricky business of finding and defining liberty. The novel, which resembles a road movie, was made into a film in 2004.

Plot
Gio, a young Georgian, falls in love with a prostitute and experiences with her two of the happiest months of his life. When his father forces him to break off the relationship, he becomes deeply depressed. He accompanies a friend, who wants to buy drugs in Azerbaijan, on his journey over the border.

In the darkness, the duo stray onto a remote country track and are arrested by an Azerbaijani patrol. They are in Karabakh, in the middle of the war. The supposedly "cool" young men from Tbilisi have no idea what is going on. Their car and their money are seized and they are thrown into a cell already occupied by an Armenian prisoner.

Events then unfold with lightning speed. Armenian fighters free their friend and the Georgians with him. Gio finds himself in an Armenian village where he is not mistreated but his every move is watched. When Russian journalists visit the village, Gio – along with two Azerbaijani prisoners and a Russian hostage – manages to flee and he makes his way safely back to the Azerbaijani base, where he is hailed a hero. His friend is still there and his purple Lada is still parked on the same spot. Only the money is gone. His friend is given a packet of drugs and a gun as compensation. Then they return to their old lives in Tbilisi.

Translations
The novel has been translated into several languages, including English, Russian, Ukrainian, and Italian.

References

External links
 Novel in Goodreads.com
 Novel in Amazon.com
 Novel review in Dalkeyarchive.com

1992 novels
20th-century Georgian novels
Adventure novels
Novels by Aka Morchiladze
Novels set in Azerbaijan
Karabakh
Works about the Nagorno-Karabakh War
Dalkey Archive Press books